Armando Molero (born January 20, 1899 or November 22, 1900 
— February 5, 1971) was a Venezuelan musician known as El Cantor de todos los tiempos (Spanish for "The singer of all times"). He was considered Maracaibo's greatest singer.

See also 
Venezuelan music

References

Year of birth uncertain
1971 deaths
People from Maracaibo
Venezuelan composers
Male composers
Venezuelan folk guitarists
Male guitarists
Venezuelan folk singers
20th-century Venezuelan male singers
20th-century composers
20th-century guitarists